Looking for Jack is the debut solo album by  Men at Work lead singer Colin Hay (under his full name), released in January 1987.

Reception

In their retrospective review, Allmusic criticised the album's "big drum sound and big rock arrangements", which they said "threaten at times to overshadow Hay's songwriting and singing." However, they praised the title track and "Circles Erratica" as highlights of Hay's career.

Track listing
All songs written by Colin Hay, except where noted.
 Side A
"Hold Me" – 4:09
"Can I Hold You?" – 3:35
"Looking for Jack" (Jeremy Alsop, Hay) – 4:10
"Master of Crime" – 4:57
"These Are Our Finest Days" – 4:07
"Nature of the Beast" (Jeremy Alsop, Hay) – 4:50

 Side B
"Puerto Rico" – 4:28
"Ways of the World" – 4:05
"I Don't Need You Anymore" – 3:04
"Circles Erratica" – 4:02
"Fisherman's Friend" – 5:31

Personnel

Musicians
Colin Hay - acoustic guitar, guitar, electric guitar, keyboards, vocals, 12-string guitar, Synclavier
Jeremy Alsop - bass, keyboards, synthesizer guitar
David Bitelli - baritone saxophone, tenor saxophone
Mike Brittain - double bass
Raul d'Oliveira - trumpet
Herbie Hancock - piano
Ginya Joseph - vocals
Chris Laurence - double bass
Joe Legwabe - vocals
Dee Lewis - vocals
Linda Lewis - vocals
Helen Liebmann - cello
Martin Loveday - cello
Ashley Maher - vocals
Noel McCalla - vocals
Russell Hitchcock - vocals
Robbie McIntosh - guitar, electric guitar
Morris Michael - vocals
Robin Millar - keyboards
Nicky Payne - tenor saxophone
Nick Pentelow - tenor saxophone
Rufus Sefothoma - vocals
Steve Sidwell - trumpet
Richard Taylor - trombone
Rick Taylor - trombone
Chad Wackerman - percussion, drums
Paul "Wix" Wickens - organ, Hammond organ

Production
Producer: Robin Millar
Engineer: Tim Kramer
Assistant engineers: Dave Anderson, Phil Legg, Nick Sykes
Mixing Engineer: Warne Livesey
Arranger: Robin Millar
Photography: David P. Bailey
Studio artwork: Bill Smith

Charts

References

Colin Hay albums
1987 debut albums
Columbia Records albums
Albums produced by Robin Millar